The Khasavyurt Accord was an agreement that marked the end of the First Chechen War, signed in Khasavyurt in Dagestan on 30 August 1996 between Alexander Lebed and Aslan Maskhadov.

History
The Khasavyurt Accord took place following a formal ceasefire agreement which was signed by General Lebed and General Maskhadov in Novye Atagi on 22 August 1996. It included technical aspects of demilitarization of the Chechen capital Grozny, the creation of joint headquarters to preclude looting in the city, the withdrawal of all federal forces from Chechnya by 31 December 1996 and a stipulation that any agreement on the relations between the Chechen Republic of Ichkeria and the Russian federal government need not be signed until late 2001. 

On 12 May 1997 the presidents of Russia and Chechnya, Boris Yeltsin and Aslan Maskhadov, met at the Moscow Kremlin to sign the final version of the treaty.

See also
Russia–Chechnya Peace Treaty

External links 
Chechnya: Khasavyurt Accords Failed To Preclude A Second War, RFE/RL, August 30, 2006
Ten years since the end of the “first Chechen war", Prague Watchdog, August 31, 2006
 Text of the Khasavyurt Accord in Russian
Text of the Khasavyurt Accord in English
Text of all peace accords for Russia

First Chechen War
Peace treaties of Russia
Chechen Republic of Ichkeria
Treaties concluded in 1996
1996 in Russia